Before the Dawn may refer to: 
 Before the Dawn (Kate Bush concert series), a set of concerts performed by British singer Kate Bush in 2014
 Before the Dawn (Kate Bush album), 2016 album consisting of live recordings from the concerts
 Before the Dawn (Shin album), 2011
 Before the Dawn (Buju Banton album), 2010
 Before the Dawn (Patrice Rushen album), 1975
 Before the Dawn (band), a melodic death/gothic metal band from Finland
 "Before the Dawn", a song by Judas Priest from the 1978 album Killing Machine
 Before the Dawn (1934 novel), by Eric Temple Bell
 Before the Dawn (novel), a novel by Tōson Shimazaki
 Before the Dawn (book), a 2006 popular science book by Nicholas Wade
 "BTD (Before the Dawn)", a 2011 single by Infinite
 Before the Dawn of the Apes, a series of three 2014 short films

See also
 Before Dawn (disambiguation)